The Iconic (styled as THE ICONIC) is a Sydney-based, Australian online fashion and sports retailer. The company was launched in 2011 and is one of Australia’s largest fashion, sports, beauty, kidswear and homewares destinations. with over 1500 brands and 165,000 items, including Australian labels P.E Nation, Sass & Bide, Camilla and Marc, Country Road, Witchery and Lorna Jane. International brands stocked include Nike, Levi’s, Calvin Klein, Adidas, MAC, Estee Lauder and more. THE ICONIC's Sydney based Fulfilment Centre spans a 28,000 sqm footprint with 46,000sqm of space, including one of the largest mezzanines and pick towers in the Southern Hemisphere.

History 
THE ICONIC was launched in 2011 by three founders and is part of the Global Fashion Group. The company has been led by CEO Erica Berchtold since May 2019. In January 2018, it was announced that former CEO Patrick Schmidt would take on a new role as Co-CEO of GFG with former Kinnevik Investment Director, Christoph Barchewitz. THE ICONIC announced in October 2018 that Rebel Sport Managing Director, Erica Berchtold, would take over as CEO in February 2019.

Achievements & Milestones 
 Wins “Best New Online Retailer” category at the 2012 Online Retailer Industry Awards (ORIA's).
 Wins “Best Social Commerce” category at the 2013 ORIAs.
 Wins “Best Social Commerce” category at the 2013 ORIAs.
 Wins “Best Mobile Commerce Site/App” at the 2014 ORIAs.
 In November 2014, The Iconic becomes the first Australian fashion retailer to deliver parcels on Saturdays with partner, Australia Post.
 In 2016, having grown from just five staff to over 400 in under five years, The Iconic moves its headquarters from a Surry Hills warehouse space to an office in the Sydney CBD.
In 2016, THE ICONIC hosted the world’s first runway Swim Show on Sydney’s iconic Bondi Beach.
THE ICONIC trials 1-hour delivery in Sydney in May 2018.
THE ICONIC launches THE ICONIC Kids in August 2018.
Wins the "Best Fashion Retailer" and "Best Online Only Retailer" at the Power Retail All Star Bash 2020 Awards.

References 

Online retailers of Australia
Clothing retailers of Australia
Companies based in Sydney
Retail companies established in 2011
Internet properties established in 2011
2011 establishments in Australia